Conchata Galen Ferrell (March 28, 1943October 12, 2020) was an American actress. Although she was a regular cast member of five sitcoms, she was best known for playing Berta the housekeeper for all 12 seasons of Two and a Half Men. For her performance as Berta, she received two nominations for the Primetime Emmy Award for Outstanding Supporting Actress in a Comedy Series (in 2005 and 2007). She had previously been nominated for the Primetime Emmy Award for Outstanding Supporting Actress in a Drama Series for her performance in L.A. Law (in 1992).

Early life
Conchata Galen Ferrell was born March 28, 1943, in Loudendale, West Virginia, to Mescal Loraine (née George) and Luther Martin Ferrell. She was raised in Charleston, West Virginia. Her family later moved to Circleville, Ohio.

She attended West Virginia University for two years, dropped out, and, after working several jobs, enrolled and graduated from Marshall University with a degree in history education. She made her first onstage performance at Marshall in 1969 in the second Barfenon Review, a skit comedy and musical production.

Career
Ferrell began her career on the stage as a member of the Circle Repertory Company. She appeared in the original Off-Broadway cast of Lanford Wilson's The Hot l Baltimore and won the Drama Desk, Obie and Theatre World Best Actress Awards for her performance in the off-Broadway play The Sea Horse.

Acting on stage, television and film for decades, she may have originally been best known for her starring role as the frontier wife in the 1979 feature film Heartland directed by Richard Pearce, and as the tough-talking owner of Mystic Pizza, co-starring alongside Lili Taylor, Annabeth Gish, and Julia Roberts, who portrayed pizza waitresses. She also played a tough, comical nurse on the short-lived 1980s TV sitcom E/R.

In 1992, she received her first Primetime Emmy Award nomination for Outstanding Supporting Actress in a Drama Series for her recurring role as Attorney Susan Bloom on the sixth season of L.A. Law, but lost to Valerie Mahaffey for Northern Exposure. She had previously appeared in an episode of the show in 1988 as Lorna Landsberg, an entirely different character.

Ferrell's supporting roles in films include performances in Deadly Hero, Network, Edward Scissorhands, Erin Brockovich, Crime and Punishment in Suburbia, Mr. Deeds and K-PAX as well as a small part in True Romance. Her other television credits include Maude, Buffy the Vampire Slayer, Hot l Baltimore, Teen Angel, Matlock, B. J. and the Bear, Good Times, Hearts Afire, Townies, Night Court, The Love Boat and Push, Nevada. She played Mrs. Werner in the episode of Quincy, M.E. titled "Into the Murdering Mind" (1982). She has also made memorable appearances portraying blunt, authoritative judges (the "Jagged Sledge" episode of Sledge Hammer! in 1987, and on "The One with Joey's Porsche" episode of Friends in 1999).

She accepted a role in the off-Broadway play Love, Loss, and What I Wore for an April 27 through May 29, 2011, run with Minka Kelly, AnnaLynne McCord, Anne Meara, and B. Smith.

Ferrell was best known for portraying Berta the Housekeeper in the CBS sitcom Two and a Half Men, appearing in a total of 212 episodes from 2003 to 2015. She had received two nominations for a Primetime Emmy Award for Outstanding Supporting Actress in a Comedy Series in 2005 and 2007, but lost to Doris Roberts for Everybody Loves Raymond and Jaime Pressly for My Name Is Earl.

In 2012, she voiced the role of Bob's Mom in Frankenweenie, which was directed by Tim Burton. She was slated to appear in the upcoming feature film Deported (2020), and had earlier acted in A Very Nutty Christmas (2018), a holiday-themed television film.

Personal life and death
Ferrell married Arnie Anderson in about 1986. She had a daughter, Samantha (born in 1982), and two stepdaughters (born in 1976 and 1979).

Ferrell was a lifelong Democrat and a practicing Methodist.

Ferrell died on October 12, 2020, from complications following cardiac arrest at the Sherman Oaks Hospital in Sherman Oaks, California. She was 77 years old.

Filmography
Source(s):

Awards and nominations

References

External links
 
 
 Biography at CBS.com

1943 births
2020 deaths
American film actresses
American stage actresses
American television actresses
Marshall University alumni
Actors from Charleston, West Virginia
Actresses from West Virginia
20th-century American actresses
21st-century American actresses
Drama Desk Award winners
West Virginia University alumni
California Democrats
West Virginia Democrats
Ohio Democrats
American Methodists